She's Spanish, I'm American is the self-titled debut EP from the folk / roots pop duo She's Spanish, I'm American, the side project that American singer-songwriter Josh Rouse formed with his Spanish girlfriend Paz Suay.  It was released on CD on January 30, 2007.

Track listing
All tracks written by Josh Rouse.

"Car Crash" – 3:43
"Jon Jon" – 3:08
"The Ocean Always Wins" – 3:53
"These Long Summer Days" – 3:18
"Answers" – 3:40

References

2006 EPs